Garnock Valley is one of the nine wards used to elect members of the North Ayrshire council. Created in 2007 as Kilbirnie and Beith and covering the small towns of Beith and Kilbirnie, it elected three Councillors. It was unaffected by a national boundary review prior to the 2017 local elections, but after the introduction of the Islands (Scotland) Act 2018, North Ayrshire's wards were re-organised for the 2022 election: Dalry and Barmill were added from the previous Dalry and West Kilbride ward (the remaining territory going to the North Coast ward) along with two extra councillors, and the name was amended to Garnock Valley to reflect its wider scope.

Councillors

Election Results

2022 Election
2022 North Ayrshire Council election

Source:

2017 Election
2017 North Ayrshire Council election

2012 Election
2012 North Ayrshire Council election

2007 Election
2007 North Ayrshire Council election

2008 By-election
A by-election arose in the Kilbirnie and Beith Ward following the death of the Scottish National Party's Craig Taylor, and Anthea Dickson held the seat for the SNP on 14 October 2008.

References

Wards of North Ayrshire
Garnock Valley
Beith
Dalry, North Ayrshire